Joseph Edward Strickland (born October 31, 1958) is an American prelate of the Catholic Church. Since his consecration on November 28, 2012, he has been the bishop of the Diocese of Tyler in eastern Texas.

Strickland has stirred controversy on several occasions with statements he has made about Democratic Party politicians and the COVID-19 vaccine.

Biography

Early life 
Joseph Strickland was born on October 31, 1958. in Fredericksburg, Texas. As a young child, his family moved to Atlanta, Texas, where his parents were founding members of St. Catherine of Siena Catholic Parish.  Strickland attended Holy Trinity Seminary in Irving, Texas.

Priesthood 
Strickland was ordained to the priesthood by Bishop Thomas Tschoepe on June 1, 1985, for the Diocese of Dallas. His first assignment was to Immaculate Conception Parish in Tyler, Texas. Upon the creation of the Diocese of Tyler in 1987, Strickland was incardinated into, or transferred to, the new diocese and was named the first vocation director in March 1987 by Bishop Charles Herzig. Strickland's service in the diocese also included periods at Sacred Heart Parish in Nacogdoches, Texas and St. Michael Parish in Mt. Pleasant, Texas.

In 1992, Strickland was assigned by Bishop Edmond Carmody to study canon law at Catholic University of America in Washington, D.C., where he earned a Licentiate of Canon Law in 1994. Returning to Texas, Strickland was named judicial vicar of the diocese and rector of the Cathedral of the Immaculate Conception. In 1995, he was named a prelate of honor with the title of monsignor by Pope John Paul II.

Strickland served as apostolic administrator of the diocese from March 2000 until January 2001 when Álvaro Corrada del Río was installed as the new bishop. In 2010, Strickland was named vicar general. He served in that capacity until being named as a delegate of the apostolic administrator upon Corrada's departure for Puerto Rico.

Bishop of Tyler
Strickland was appointed as bishop of the Diocese of Tyler by Pope Benedict XVI on September 29, 2012, and was consecrated on November 28, 2012, at Caldwell Auditorium in Tyler. Cardinal Daniel DiNardo was the celebrant and principal consecrator.  Strickland is the first native East Texan to head the 33-county diocese.

Views

Politics 
On November 4, 2012, days before the 2012 United States presidential election, Strickland led a public rally and prayer service in downtown Tyler asking the faithful to turn toward God prior to the election. In an editorial written for the Tyler Morning Telegraph, Strickland said:The fundamental truths that once were and still should be the bedrock of our society are being challenged daily. I believe the election on Nov. 6 brings a great task to all of us as people of faith to soberly reflect on what we believe and how those beliefs should be embodied in our laws and supported by our leaders.

In September 2020,  Strickland endorsed a video by James Altman, a priest in the Diocese of Lacrosse, who said "You cannot be Catholic and be a Democrat." In 2021, Altman's bishop, William Callahan of LaCrosse, asked Altman to resign as pastor.

Sex abuse scandal 
In August 2018, Archbishop Emeritus Carlo Maria Viganò released a letter accusing several high-ranking prelates, including Pope Francis, of covering up allegations of sexual abuse against former Cardinal Theodore McCarrick, and calling on those responsible, including Francis, to resign. Strickland stated that he found Viganò's allegations "credible." In January 2020, after meeting with  Francis, Strickland said he never agreed with Viganò calling for the pope's resignation and that he was satisfied with the Holy See's investigation of McCarrick.

COVID-19 pandemic 
In May 2020, Strickland signed a petition released by Viganò which criticized restrictions during the COVID-19 pandemic as intentionally "creating panic among the world's population with the sole aim of permanently imposing unacceptable forms of restriction on freedoms." The petition singles out the use of contact tracing devices as well as mandatory vaccination as infringements on people's rights, and cites "growing doubts ... about the actual contagiousness, danger, and resistance of the virus."

Tridentine Mass 
Strickland began to celebrate the Tridentine Mass in June 2020. He described this form of the Mass as being heavily permeated with reverence and beauty. Strickland encouraged Catholics to attend Mass in the traditional form of the Roman rite, and encouraged Catholics attached to the Tridentine Mass to attend the Mass of Paul VI, which he said could also be conducted reverently. In 2021, Pope Francis imposed restrictions on the celebration of the Tridentine Mass.

LGBT rights 
In a documentary released in October 2020,  Francis expressed support for the legalization of civil unions; Strickland dismissed the pope's statement as merely opinion, and said that its release was confusing and dangerous.

Vaccines 
In a December 2020 letter to his diocese regarding the COVID-19 vaccines, Strickland wrote "I urge you to reject any vaccine that uses the remains of aborted children." He later tweeted, "The fact remains that ANY vaccine available today involves using murdered children before they could even be born."  He added, "I renew my pledge — I will not extend my life by USING murdered children. This is evil WAKE UP!"

Bibliography

 Light and Leaven: The Challenge of the Laity in the Twenty-First Century, 2020

Arms

See also

 Catholic Church hierarchy
 Catholic Church in the United States
 Historical list of the Catholic bishops of the United States
 List of Catholic bishops of the United States
 Lists of patriarchs, archbishops, and bishops

References

External links 

Roman Catholic Diocese of Tyler

 

1958 births
Living people
People from Fredericksburg, Texas
Catholic University of America alumni
Roman Catholic Ecclesiastical Province of Galveston–Houston
Religious leaders from Texas
People from Atlanta, Texas
Catholics from Texas
21st-century Roman Catholic bishops in the United States